The year 2007 is the 2nd year in the history of Strikeforce, a mixed martial arts promotion based in the United States. In 2007 Strikeforce held 4 events beginning with, Strikeforce: Young Guns.

Title fights

Events list

Strikeforce: Young Guns

Strikeforce: Young Guns was an event held on February 10, 2007 at the San Jose Civic Auditorium in San Jose, California.

Results

Strikeforce: Shamrock vs. Baroni

Strikeforce: Shamrock vs. Baroni was an event held on June 22, 2007 at the HP Pavilion at San Jose in San Jose, California.

Results

Strikeforce: Playboy Mansion

Strikeforce: Playboy Mansion was an event held on September 29, 2007 at The Playboy Mansion in Beverly Hills, California.

Results

Strikeforce: Four Men Enter, One Man Survives

Strikeforce: Four Men Enter, One Man Survives was an event held on November 16, 2007 at the HP Pavilion at San Jose in San Jose, California.

Results

See also 
 List of Strikeforce champions
 List of Strikeforce events

References

Strikeforce (mixed martial arts) events
2007 in mixed martial arts